Clay Township is an inactive township in Saline County, in the U.S. state of Missouri.

Clay Township was erected in 1837, taking its name from Kentucky statesman Henry Clay.

References

Townships in Missouri
Townships in Saline County, Missouri